The filetail fanskate (Sympterygia lima) is a species of fish in the family Arhynchobatidae. It is endemic to the Pacific coast of Chile. Its natural habitat is open seas.

References

Sources

Sympterygia
Fish of Chile
Fish described in 1835
Taxonomy articles created by Polbot
Taxa named by Eduard Friedrich Poeppig